Hind Bensari (Arabic: هند بن ساري; born 1987), is a Moroccan filmmaker. She is well known as the director that made critically acclaimed documentary films: 475: Break the Silence and We Could Be Heroes.

Personal life
She was born in 1987 in Casablanca, Morocco. However at very young age, she moved to London. Bensari graduated with a degree in Economics and Middle-Eastern studies from Edinburgh University. She also holds a certificate in International Political Economy from the London School of Economics and Political Science.

She is married to a Danish businessman and currently lives in Denmark.

Career
In 2014, she returned Morocco to make her maiden documentary short film was 475: Break the Silence. It has contributed to a movement in Morocco to that succeeded in repealing a new law that allowed men accused of rape to marry their victims. The film won critical acclaim from the New York Times and Germany's ARD channel as well as was an internet sensation. It also broke the audience record at 2M TV in Morocco and broadcast in other countries including Denmark, Portugal, Canada and sold for more than 20 worldwide channels. She is also a TEDx speaker.

On 2 May 2018, she released the film We Could Be Heroes which was premiered at 2018 Hot Docs Canadian International Documentary Film Festival. The film is based on a story of two disabled friends, Azzedine and Youssef, who dreams to break out of the prison and compete in Rio Paralympic Games. The film won the Jury Prize at the Hot Docs Canadian International Documentary Festival. The film was also won the "Best International Documentary Award" in Toronto International Film Festival, becoming the first African filmmaker to receive the award. Then the film won Grand Prix at the Tangier National Film Festival.

Filmography

References

External links
 
 We Could Be Heroes

1987 births
21st-century Moroccan people
Living people
Moroccan film directors
People from Casablanca